Maipo Island is a low, snow-covered island lying at the entrance to Buls Bay in eastern Brabant Island, in the Palmer Archipelago, Antarctica. The island was first roughly charted by the Belgian Antarctic Expedition, 1897–99. The name appears on a 1947 Chilean government chart and commemorates the work of the Maipo, an oil tanker which participated in several Chilean Antarctic Expeditions during the 1940s and 1950s.

See also 
 List of Antarctic and sub-Antarctic islands

References

Islands of the Palmer Archipelago